Armenia sent a delegation to compete at the 1998 Winter Olympics in Nagano, Japan, from 7–22 February 1998. This marked the nation's second appearance at a Winter Olympics as an independent country.  The Armenian delegation consisted of seven athletes: four in figure skating, one in freestyle skiing, one in cross-country skiing, and one in alpine skiing.

Alpine skiing

Men

Cross-country skiing

Women

C = Classical style, F = Freestyle

Figure skating

Pairs

Ice Dancing

Freestyle skiing

Men

References
Official Olympic Reports
WinterArmenia.com
Olympic Winter Games 1998, full results by sports-reference.com

1998 in Armenian sport
Nations at the 1998 Winter Olympics
1998